Aloe sinana  is a succulent plant species from Ethiopia. It is related to Aloe camperi. It is a shrubby Aloe with leaves longer than Aloe camperi and different inflorescence. The flowers are orange-red in color. 

The species was first formally described by the botanist Gilbert Westacott Reynolds in 1957.

References

External links
Aloe sinana  The Plant List
Aloe sinana  Encyclopedia of Life

  

sinana
Plants described in 1957
Flora of Ethiopia